Beyblade: Metal Fusion, known in Japan as Metal Fight Beyblade, is a 2009 Japanese anime television series based on Takafumi Adachi's manga series of the same name, which itself is based on the Beyblade spinning top game from Takara Tomy. The 51-episode series was produced by d-rights and Nelvana under the direction of Kunihisa Sugishima.

The series was first broadcast on TV Tokyo in Japan between April 5, 2009 and March 28, 2010. Nelvana announced that it will air in Canada's on May 15, 2010 on YTV. In the United States, Cartoon Network premiere the show on June 26, 2010 on the United Kingdom premiered on September 13, 2010, in Australia premiered on Network Ten on November 10, 2010 and Latin America premiered on April 18, 2011 on Disney XD. In India , Cartoon Network India premiered the show on  11 October 2010 

Two pieces of theme music were used for the opening and closing themes. The opening theme is  performed by Yu+Ki and the ending theme is  performed by MASH. The first 23 episodes were released on six DVD compilations of three to four episodes each by Sony Pictures Entertainment. The first compilation was released on July 15, 2009 while the sixth compilation was released on December 9, 2009. The remaining 28 episodes were released on seven DVD compilations under the title . The first compilation was released on January 13, 2010 while the seventh compilation was released on July 14, 2010. Beyblade: Metal Fusion was followed by a second series titled Beyblade: Metal Masters.



Episode list

References

Metal Fusion Season 1
2009 Japanese television seasons
2010 Japanese television seasons